Pultenaea verruculosa is a species of flowering plant in the family Fabaceae and is endemic to the south-west of Western Australia. It is an erect shrub with flat, hairy leaves, and yellow-orange and red, pea-like flowers.

Description
Flowering occurs from September to November and the fruit is a flattened pod.

Taxonomy and naming
Pultenaea verruculosa was first formally described in 1853 by Nikolai Turczaninow in the Bulletin de la Société impériale des naturalistes de Moscou from specimens collected by James Drummond. The specific epithet (verruculosa) means "somewhat covered with warts", referring to the leaves.

Distribution
This pultenaea grows on sandplains in the Avon Wheatbelt, Esperance Plains, Jarrah Forest, Mallee, Swan Coastal Plain and Warren biogeographic regions in the south of Western Australia.

Conservation status
Pultenaea verruculosa is classified as "not threatened" by the Government of Western Australia Department of Biodiversity, Conservation and Attractions.

References

verruculosa
Eudicots of Western Australia
Plants described in 1853
Taxa named by Nikolai Turczaninow